Biała is a river in eastern Poland in Podlaskie Voivodeship, a left tributary of the Supraśl River, with a length of 29.9 kilometres and a basin area of 119 km2. Biała passes through Białystok from south to north-east.

Tributaries 
Major tributaries of Biała are:
 Dolistówka
 Bażantarka

Rivers of Podlaskie Voivodeship
Rivers of Poland